The following pairings won the US Open tennis championship at Women's Doubles.

Champions

U.S. National Championships

US Open

See also

US Open other competitions
List of US Open men's singles champions
List of US Open men's doubles champions
List of US Open women's singles champions
List of US Open mixed doubles champions

Grand Slam women's doubles
List of Australian Open women's doubles champions
List of French Open women's doubles champions
List of Wimbledon ladies' doubles champions
List of Grand Slam women's doubles champions

References

External links
 List of US Open Women's Doubles Champions

Women
US Open
Women's tennis in the United States
US Open